Hicks Creek is a stream in Bandera County, Texas, in the United States.

Hicks Creek (originally Coker creek) was renamed in the 1850s for a pioneer settler.

See also
List of rivers of Texas

References

Rivers of Bandera County, Texas
Rivers of Texas